Katsuki Yamazaki (山崎 勝己, born August 16, 1982) is a Japanese former professional baseball catcher. He has played in Nippon Professional Baseball (NPB) for the Fukuoka Daiei Hawks / Fukuoka SoftBank Hawks and Orix Buffaloes.

Career

On August 7, 2005, Yamazaki made his NPB debut.

On November 4, 2020, Yamazaki announced his retirement.

References

External links

NPB stats

1982 births
Living people
Fukuoka Daiei Hawks players
Fukuoka SoftBank Hawks players
Japanese baseball coaches
Japanese baseball players
Orix Buffaloes players
Nippon Professional Baseball catchers
Nippon Professional Baseball coaches
People from Itami, Hyōgo